Woodward's eagle (Buteogallus woodwardi) is an extinct species of eagle that lived in North America and the Caribbean during the Late Pleistocene. 

It is one of the largest birds of prey ever found, with an estimated total length , slightly larger than the Harpy eagle. Haast's eagle reached bigger lengths and appears to have been also more robust than Woodward's - Haast's was a forest-dwelling species. Woodward's eagle appears to have hunted in open habitats, taking primarily small mammals and reptiles.

References

Pleistocene birds of North America
Pleistocene birds
Birds of prey
Accipitridae
Fossil taxa described in 1911